Osvaldo Ancinas (born 26 March 1934) is an Argentine alpine skier. He competed at the 1960 Winter Olympics and the 1964 Winter Olympics.

References

1934 births
Living people
Argentine male alpine skiers
Olympic alpine skiers of Argentina
Alpine skiers at the 1960 Winter Olympics
Alpine skiers at the 1964 Winter Olympics